Christina Liebherr (born 16 March 1979) is a German-born Swiss equestrian who competes in the sport of show jumping.

She won the bronze medal at the 2008 Summer Olympics in team jumping following the disqualification of Norwegian rider Tony André Hansen.

Career 
Christina Liebherr began riding at the age of nine. From December 1995 till August 2011 she was trained by German Rider Susanne Behring.

She was selected for the 2008 Summer Olympics where she rode LB No Mercy and won the bronze medal in team jumping following the disqualification of Norwegian rider Tony André Hansen.

Personal life 
Her grandfather is the founder of the Liebherr Group; Hans Liebherr.

Horses

Current
 LB Callas Sitte (born 1998), Zangersheide, Mare, sire: Calvaro Z, Owner: Hans Liebherr
 LB Con Grazia CH (born 2003), Mare, sire: Con Spirito R, damsire: Karondo v. Schlösslihof, Owner: Hans Liebherr

Former show horses
 LB No Mercy (born 1995), Gelding, sire: Libero H, damsire: Dillenburg, Owner: Hans Liebherr

Successes 
 Olympic Games:
 2004: with LB No Mercy - Rank 5 (Team) + Rank 14 (Individual)
 2008: with LB No Mercy - Rank 3 (Team)
 FEI World Equestrian Games
 2006, Aachen: Rank 5 (Team) + Rank 11 (Individual)
 European Championships: 
 2005, San Patrignano: Rank 2 (Team) + Rank 2 (Individual)

References

1979 births
Equestrians at the 2004 Summer Olympics
Equestrians at the 2008 Summer Olympics
Living people
Olympic bronze medalists for Switzerland
Olympic equestrians of Switzerland
Swiss show jumping riders
Swiss female equestrians
Olympic medalists in equestrian
Swiss people of German descent
Sportspeople from Stuttgart
Medalists at the 2008 Summer Olympics